A Peacock's Tale is the first studio release by Magic Eight Ball. It's a 4-song EP originally released in 2007, but was later re-released under the band's Magic Cat Records label.

Background 
Prior to the formation of Magic Cat Records, the band originally released 'A Peacock's Tale' on CD in 2007 (and later digitally as well with slightly different bonus tracks). The 2012 re-release of the EP on Magic Cat Records was remastered by Dave Draper using one of the original 2007 Neil Sadler mixes and three of Neil's new 2012 remixes. 

P.S. The instrumental 'L. N. E. (For The Love Of Three Girls)' has since been renamed and re-recorded as 'Peacocks'.

Track listing

Personnel

Musicians 
 Baz Francis - Vocals, guitars & piano
 Mike Corbyn - Drums 
 Robbie J. Holland - Live bass

Production 
 Dave Draper - Remastering for 2012 release at The Panic Room
 Neil Sadler Mixing and engineering at No Machine Studios
 Produced by Neil Sadler, Baz Francis, Mike Corbyn & Robbie J. Holland

Art direction 
 Kate Wilkinson - Design layout by Kate Wilkinson 
 Maryhèléna Francis - Illustrations and band photography
 Jeremy Parish - Original CD packaging design
 Baz Francis - Design concept & peacock feathers photograph
 Artwork alterations by Giles Edwards, Jeannine Wyss, Joseph Conlon & Tariq Hussain

Additional credits 
 Remixing of tracks 1, 3 and 4 by Neil Sadler at No Machine Studios, Wokingham, Berkshire, England Remastering of tracks 1-4 by Dave Draper at The Panic Room, Evesham, Worcestershire, England
 Digital bonus tracks 5 and 6 produced by The Bryster at Radio Bronglais, Aberystwyth, Ceredigion, Wales
 Digital bonus track 7 produced by Neil Sadler, Baz Francis and Robbie J. Holland Digital bonus track 8 produced by Baz Francis.
 Initial data transferal on ‘L. N. E. (For The Love Of Three Girls)’ and ‘Baby, Is It So?’ took place at Running Frog Studios (Windsor, Berkshire, England) with a level of primary editing and other studio work being done on the tracks by Neil Thom.

References

External links 

2007 debut EPs
Power pop EPs
Magic Eight Ball albums